Aulis Olavi Saikku (21 March 1909 – 14 July 2003) was a Finnish diplomat and an official in the Ministry for Foreign Affairs. He is a master of philosophy by education.

Saikku was born in Sääksmäki. He was employed by the Ministry of Foreign Affairs in 1934. He was Assistant in Riga from 1934 to 1935, Oslo from 1936 to 1938, Rome from 1938 to 1939, Assistant to the Ministry for Foreign Affairs 1939, Assistant and Consul in Rome from 1940 to 1943, Secretary of State for Foreign Affairs from 1943 to 1944, Commercial Representative in Stockholm from 1944 to 1945, Secretary General of the Ministry of Foreign Affairs and Head of Division from 1945 to 1946, Secretary of State in Copenhagen from 1947 to 1950, Counselor and Counselor from 1956 to 1958, Department Secretary of the Ministry of Foreign Affairs and Chief of Division from 1959 to 1963, Counselor in London from 1964 to 1966, Finnish Ambassador to Lagos from 1966 to 1969, Yaoundé, Abidjan and Dakar from 1967 to 1969, Chief Executive Officer of the Ministry of Foreign Affairs from 1955 to 1956, 1969, Finnish Ambassador to Algeria from 1969 to 1972, at the same time in Tunisia and Tripoli from 1969 to 1972, negotiating officer of the Ministry of Foreign Affairs (Foreign Affairs Counsel) from 1972 to 1974.

References

1909 births
2003 deaths
Ambassadors of Finland to Nigeria
Ambassadors of Finland to Senegal
Ambassadors of Finland to Cameroon
Ambassadors of Finland to Ivory Coast
Ambassadors of Finland to Algeria
Ambassadors of Finland to Tunisia
Ambassadors of Finland to Libya